Pajo Ivošević (born 18 May 1968) is a Serbian former wrestler. He competed for Yugoslavia and appeared as one of the Independent Olympic Participants at the 1992 Summer Olympics in the men's Greco-Roman 90 kg.

He was later the head coach of the Serbian wrestling team.

References

External links
 

1968 births
Living people
Serbian male sport wrestlers
Yugoslav male sport wrestlers
Olympic wrestlers as Independent Olympic Participants
Wrestlers at the 1992 Summer Olympics
Place of birth missing (living people)